John Baker or Jon Baker may refer to:

Military figures
John Baker (American Revolutionary War) (1731–1787), American Revolutionary War hero, for whom Baker County, Georgia was named
John Baker (RAF officer) (1897–1978), British air marshal
John Drayton Baker (1915–1942), United States Navy officer
John Baker (general) (1936–2007), Australian Chief of the Defence Force
John F. Baker Jr. (1945–2012), American soldier, Medal of Honor recipient
John Baker (Royal Navy officer) (1660–1716), English naval officer, MP for Weymouth and Melcombe Regis
John Baker (Medal of Honor, 1876) (1853–?), American soldier

Political figures
John Baker (fl. 1388), English Member of Parliament (MP) for Horsham, 1388
John Baker (died 1406), English MP for Southwark, 1406
John Baker (fl. 1407), English MP for Lyme Regis, 1407
John Baker (MP for Lewes), see Lewes
John Baker (died c.1421), English MP for Helston, 1414
John Baker (fl. 1421), English MP for Devizes, 1421
John Baker (died 1544) (by 1503–44), English MP for Radnorshire
Sir John Baker (died 1558) (1488–1558), English speaker of the House of Commons
John Baker (MP for Bedford) (by 1501–1538 or later), English mayor and MP of Bedford
John Baker (by 1531–1604/6), English MP for Horsham and Bramber
John Baker (MP for East Grinstead), English MP for East Grinstead in 1648
John Baker (MP for Canterbury) (c. 1754–1831), British MP for Canterbury
John Baker (representative) (1769–1823), United States congressman from Virginia
John Baker (Baker Brook) (1796–1868), Canadian political activist in Baker Brook, New Brunswick
John Baker (Australian politician) (1813–1872), briefly the Premier of South Australia
John Baker (1812–1897), American politician from Beverly, Massachusetts
Sir John Baker (Portsmouth MP) (1828–1909), British MP for Portsmouth
John Tamatoa Baker (1852–1921), Hawaiian rancher, sheriff and governor
John Baker (Labour politician) (1867–1939), British Labour MP for Bilston
John Baker (Wisconsin politician) (1869–?), American politician from Wisconsin
John Baker (defensive lineman, born 1935) (1935–2007), American professional football player and then sheriff of Wake County, North Carolina
John Baker (Indiana politician) (1832–1915), United States congressman from Indiana
John Aaron Baker (1839–1919), American politician in Wisconsin
John S. Baker (1861–1955), American politician from Washington
Sir John Baker, 2nd Baronet (1608–1653), English politician
John A. Baker Jr. (1927–1994), U.S. diplomat
John Arnold Baker (1925–2016), British judge and politician
John Baker II (1780–1843), sheriff of Norfolk County, Massachusetts, 1834–1843

Sports figures

Baseball
 John Baker (baseball) (born 1981), American baseball player
 John Franklin Baker or Home Run Baker (1886–1963), American professional baseball player
 Johnnie "Dusty" Baker (born 1949), American baseball manager and former player

Gridiron football
 John Baker (defensive lineman, born 1935) (1935–2007), professional football player, sheriff of Wake County, North Carolina 
 John Baker (defensive lineman, born 1942), American and Canadian football defensive end
 John Baker (punter) (born 1977), American football punter
 Johnny Baker (guard) (1907–1979), American football player and coach
 Johnny Baker (linebacker) (born 1941), American football linebacker and tight end
Jon Baker (linebacker) (1923–1992), American football linebacker
Jon Baker (placekicker) (born 1972), American football placekicker

Other sports
John Baker (Australian footballer) (1918–1988), Australian rules footballer for North Melbourne
 John Baker (cricketer) (born 1933), former English cricketer
 John Baker (Ghanaian footballer), Ghanaian international footballer in squad that won 1982 African Cup for the fourth time
 John Baker (musher) (born 1962/3), American dogsled racer
 John Baker (runner) (1944–1970), American cross-country runner
John Baker (rugby league), Australian rugby league footballer
John Baker (diver) (born 1951), British diver

Music
John Baker (Radiophonic musician) (1937–1997), British composer and musician
John Baker, British musician and member of The Korgis (active since 1978)
John Bevan Baker (1926–1994), British composer
John Baker, composer for ToeJam & Earl (1991–1994)
Jon Baker (producer) (born 1960), British-Jamaican music industry executive
Jon Baker, musician (active 1989–1991), member of English indie rock band The Charlatans

Science
John Baker (biologist) (1900–1984), British biologist and anthropologist
John Baker, Baron Baker (1901–1985), British engineer
John Gilbert Baker (1834–1920), British botanist
J. N. L. Baker (John Norman Leonard Baker, 1893–1971), British geographer
John Holland Baker (1841–1930), New Zealand surveyor and public servant

Writers
John Baker (author) (born 1942), British novelist
John Baker (legal historian) (born 1944), English legal historian, Downing Professor of the Laws of England, University of Cambridge
John Roman Baker (born 1944), British playwright and activist

Religious figures
John Baker (bishop) (1928–2014), Bishop of Salisbury
John Gilbert Baker (bishop) (1910–1986), bishop of Anglican Diocese of Hong Kong and Macau
John Baker (priest) (died 1745), English Anglican vice-master of Trinity College, Cambridge

Others

John Baker (barrister) (1711–1779), English barrister, Solicitor-General of the Leeward Islands (1750–1753) and diarist
John Baker (artist) (1726–1771), English flower painter
John Baker (stained glass artist) (1916–2007), British artist, teacher, conservator and author
John Wynn Baker (died 1775), Irish agricultural economist
John William Baker (c. 1775–1860), plantation owner in Cuba
John Baker (entrepreneur) (born 1976), Canadian businessman, founder and president of D2L
Jon Baker, fictional character in the American TV show CHiPs

Given name 
John Baker White (clerk of court) (1794–1862), American military officer, lawyer, court clerk, and civil servant
John Baker White (West Virginia politician) (1868–1944), American military officer, lawyer, and politician in West Virginia
John Baker White (British politician) (1902–1988), British politician

See also
Jonathan Baker (disambiguation)
Jack Baker (disambiguation)